Argyripa is a genus of flower chafer belonging to the family Scarabaeidae.

This genus includes medium-sized flower chafer without metallic sheen. The color of the body is usually yellow with black dots. The genus is widespread in Central America and in the northern of most South America.

Species
Species within this genus include:
 Argyripa anomala (Bates, 1869)
 Argyripa gloriosa Ratcliffe, 1978
 Argyripa lansbergei (Sallé, 1857)
 Argyripa moroni Arnaud, 1988
 Argyripa porioni Arnaud, 1988
 Argyripa subfasciata Ritsema, 1885

References

Cetoniinae
Beetle genera